Liberalism in the Netherlands started as an anti-monarchical effort spearheaded by the Dutch statesman Thorbecke, who almost single-handedly wrote the 1848 Constitution of the Netherlands that turned the country into a constitutional monarchy.

In contemporary politics, there are both left and right-wing parties that refer to themselves as "liberal", with the former more often espousing social liberalism and the latter more often espousing liberalism. A common characteristic of these parties that they are nominally irreligious, in contrast to the traditionally dominant and still popular Christian democracy.

In the contemporary economic situation, even though the markets for basic needs services like food and clothing are still subject to economic liberalism, this is not the case in housing, in child education, health care and payment services. For example the health care system does not satisfy basic requirements for being a market economy because in the distribution of goods and services the offered supply is not subject to patients demands, like this is the case in Germany.

This article gives an overview of liberalism in the Netherlands both as a movement politically espoused by the leading parties and what is actually implemented as liberal economic policy.

Background of economic liberalism

Even though the economic system is relatively highly ranked in terms of overall economic freedom, there are a number of sectors in the market that are inherently economically non-liberal. For example the health care system that consists of a market-driven welfare state can be considered to be non-liberal with respect to countries like Belgium, England, Sweden, and Germany where respectively Ziekenfonds in België, National Health Service (England), Health care in Sweden, and German statutory health insurance are state run and leave a market for individual private insurance and medical services.

There is no free-market in housing and building plots, because the municipal governments, through zoning plans, release the farming land for building, to the public subsidized housing, the housing associations and what is left for the private building industry, leading to special interest politics for home price levels and the distribution of building plots, and shortages and high prices for starters on the housing and labor markets.

Background of legal liberalism

The Dutch constitution was revised many times. In 1983 the list of constitutional  [:nl:Grondrechten|fundamental rights] were altered, to include universal equal treatment and non-discrimination in the first article, applying to all, regardless of whether they are government officials, working for a business, or any other civilian. This contrasts with similar articles in European Convention on Human Rights or the United States Bill of Rights, that understands equal treatment as a liberty of all resident civilians, that only holds for conduct of government in due process, fair trial and all the welfare state services. Since universal equal treatment, a Marxist egalitarian doctrine, conflicts with property rights, freedom of contract and within this context the freedom of speech and freedom of association, it cannot be considered economically liberal and respecting the free will subject to property rights.

The Netherlands has a European continental legal system, with an inquisitional prosecuting judge within the criminal justice system that is supposed to maintain the principles of natural justice alone instead of balancing prejudice and bias by allowing both sides to question. There is no possibility for private prosecution, which could help with criminally prosecuting government officials, in contrast with France, England, Germany and many USA states where this is possible.

The police services are all national instead of municipal.

The constitution has a limited implementation of separation of powers, since the parliamentary government cabinet creates both the laws and leads the executive government, in contrast to the scarce situation of the EU where the executive government is not headed by the EU commission but the EU council. The government can be dissolved on a resolution of a motion of distrust, after which the same people may form the next government. There is no process of impeachment of the heads of government or state defined in the constitution. The Council for the Judiciary  leading the judiciary power is independent of the Ministry of Justice.
There is no real independent constitutional court in the Netherlands. Just like the UK legislation cannot be contested by administrative court procedure, because of the antireview clause in the constitution. Moreover already since the Torbecke's constitution of 1848 the laws of parliament overrule the laws of the constitution on collision. Parliamentary laws also overrule international treaties, as demonstrated by the law of equal treatment, which allows for positive discrimination and prioritizes over the anti-discrimination clause of the Charter of Fundamental Rights of the European Union, even though the Netherlands is considered a monist country. An executive Council of State (Netherlands) must be consulted by the cabinet before an executive legislative bill is proposed to parliament. The advisory role of the council of state, also violates the principle of separation of powers. The parliament also has the constitutional rights to initiate a proposal for a bill.

The justice system in the Netherlands, lacks legal certainty because regular people and even experts are unable to predict the legality of an action or outcome of the question of law when the question of fact is fully known. Contributing to this issue is the usage of judicial discretion, which could be used to resolve ambiguity in the application of legal norms, left by the legislature, determining when a norm applies and what the corresponding legal consequences are. Legal theory describes this as the mutation of the deontic legal position of legal entities by the primary legal norms of conduct and the corresponding sanction norms. By nature, this also includes application of norm collision rules, and determination of what judicial interpretation is appropriate. This problem can be mediated by rejection of unclear legislation by the judiciary after constitutional review or judicial review. Alternatively legal certainty could be improved by having local jurisdictions maintain consistent partisan (politics) judges required to apply a consistent political ideology, say classical liberalism, and only allowing judicial discretion there when a precedent is required.

Punishment by legislative or executive (statutory) decision is allowed as demonstrated by the 'imported' EU parliament decision on Arkady_Volozh#Resignation_from_Yandex. This contrasts with the USA where bills of attainder are explicitly banned by the constitution, although in case of national emergency executive punishment is allowed through International_Emergency_Economic_Powers_Act. In liberal legal systems punishment by the state happens strictly via due process] of the justice system. 

The constitution forwardly defines executive acts called AMvB's, that were later defined in the corresponding parliamentary law, which are called laws in formal sense. Both can be laws in material sense i.e. enforced laws. Executive act usually involve decisions concerning administrative procedure, but in practice may involve declaring a state of emergency, participating or getting involved in acts of war or declaring a state of martial law. In a liberal legal system these type of decisions require the explicit consent of parliament, or are plainly unconstitutional. In the USA a state of martial law, state of emergency, and in particular a curfew can still not violate the US Bill of Rights limiting the effect.

Background in democratic liberalism
The Netherlands has a limited form of democracy because members of the municipal government council, the regional board, provincial government council and the national government council are elected, but the municipal mayor, the provincial governor, the public prosecutors, the law enforcement commissioners, and the judges are all chosen by the national executive government, in contrast with many USA states. This allows very little opportunity for decentralized differences between provinces and municipalities.
The delegation of the national legislative power to the EU parliament conflict with John Locke's principle of nondelegation, which secures decentralization of powers.

Background of liberal politics
The Netherlands has a long liberal political tradition. From the founding of the Dutch Republic in the 16th century to beginning of the 19th century the main political conflict was between the liberal urban patriciate and the supporters of the House of Orange, from the lower class and orthodox variants of Protestantism. The urban patriciate favoured religious tolerance. Between mid-19th century to the late-1800 they were a dominant force in shaping the Dutch parliamentary democratic rechtsstaat. In the early 20th century the liberals split between progressive liberals and conservative liberals. Due to their political division and the introduction of universal suffrage the liberals disappeared from the political stage. After the Second World War the liberals were united again under one roof, the VVD, but the party remained small. It entered some administration coalitions as a junior party. A progressive liberal party, D'66 was founded in 1966. Since the 1970s however liberalism has been on the rise again electorally. Since 1977 the largest, more conservative, liberal party, VVD has been in government for twenty two years. In early 21st century the VVD saw major splits over the issue of integration and migration. In 2010, they won the national elections for the first time in its history.

Before 1918 

In the early years of the Kingdom of the Netherlands (1814–1848) the House of Representatives was dominated by conservatives supportive of the policy of government of William I and later William II. From 1840 onward, the amount of liberals in the House gradually increased. These liberals advocated a parliamentary democracy with a directly elected House of Representatives and in which the ministers, not the King, had executive power. In 1844, nine liberal representatives led by the jurist and historian Johan Rudolph Thorbecke attempted in vain to amend the constitution and introduce parliamentary democracy. In 1848, amidst a wave of revolutions across Europe, the balance of power shifted in favour of the liberals. In order to prevent civil unrest in the Netherlands, William II formed a commission, chaired by Thorbecke, which would draft a new constitution. The new constitution, which was introduced in October 1848, limited the power of the king by introducing ministerial responsibility and by giving parliament the right to amend laws and hold investigative hearings. It also extended the census suffrage and codified civil rights, such as the freedom of assembly, the privacy of correspondence, freedom of ecclesiastical organisation and the freedom of education.

In the period following the constitutional amendment, liberalism was the dominant political force in the Netherlands. Liberalism also dominated the universities, the media and business. The liberals supported a laissez-faire economy, free trade, civil rights and a gradual expansion of suffrage. Thorbecke became Prime Minister of the Netherlands in 1849, and would serve two more terms throughout his lifetime. Because of their dominant position, the liberals did not deem it necessary to organise themselves in a political party. Instead there was a loose liberal parliamentary group and locally organised liberal caucuses. The liberals also did not organize their own pillar, a system of like-minded social organisations. The liberals were politically allied with the Catholics, whom the liberals granted considerable freedom of religion. After Thorbecke's death in 1872, the liberals grew increasingly disunited. By 1897, a division had emerged between the supporters of the progressive liberal Jan Kappeyne van de Coppello on the one side, and those of the conservative liberal Johan George Gleichman on the other.

Only in the late 19th century, when the opposition began to organise itself in the Anti-Revolutionary Party and the Roman Catholic State Party, the liberals followed suit. On 4 March 1885, the Liberal Union was established. In the 1890s some liberals, such as Samuel van Houten, Johannes Tak van Poortvliet and Kappeyne van de Coppello started to propose a more active role of the government, breaking with the Thorbeckian laissez-faire ideal. This led to the establishment of the progressive Free-thinking Democratic League in 1901. The liberals saw a second split with the establishment of the more conservative liberal League of Free Liberals in 1906. There are different names for these two tendencies. The more progressive liberals have been called "radical", "freeminded" or "democratic" liberals, while the more conservative liberals have been called "free" or "old" liberals. The issue which divided the liberals most was the question whether to extend the census or even to introduce universal suffrage, the progressive liberals favoured universal suffrage, the conservative liberals did not. The progressive liberals also favoured government intervention in the economy, such as Van Houten's ban on child labour.

Due to the two round electoral system the liberals were required to cooperate. In order to prevent the coalition of Catholics and Protestants win the second round of the elections, all the liberals united behind their candidates in the second round, often joined by social democrats. This alliance was called the concentration. On basis of concentration pluralities, often supported by social democrats for a majority several cabinets were formed in the early 20th century.

In 1917 under one of these liberal minority cabinets universal male suffrage was introduced, as well as a proportional electoral system and equal finance for religious schools, this compromise was called the pacification of 1917. The extension of suffrage however severely weakened the position of the liberals. Of the 37 seats they had in 1917, they were left with 14 in 1918.

1918-1994 

In 1922 the liberal parties reorganized: all conservative liberals, from the Liberal Union and the League Free Liberals as well as more conservative liberals from smaller parties, joined to form the Liberal State Party. The progressive liberals remained separate in the Freeminded Democratic League, a merger of the Radical League and progressive liberals, that had already been formed in 1901. In the interbellum the liberals grew even smaller. Under pressure of the Wall Street Crash of 1929 and the rise of the National Socialist Movement. The liberals did cooperate as junior partners in several cabinets in the crisis.

After the Second World War the conservative liberal Liberal State Party refounded itself as Freedom Party. The progressive liberal Freeminded Democratic League joined the new Doorbraak leftwing Labour Party. Several progressives were unhappy with the social-democratic course of the PvdA and joined the Freedom Party to found the People's Party for Freedom and Democracy in 1948.

The VVD remained a small party until the 1970s, with about 10% of the vote. They did however form part of the government both in the grand coalition with social-democrats, Catholics and Protestants in the late 1940s early 1950s, and with the Catholics and Protestants over the course of the 1960s. The party was led by the former leader of the Freeminded Democratic League, Pieter Oud. In the Dutch pillarized political system the liberals mainly appealed to urban, secular upper and middle class. The liberals did not have a strong pillar of social organization, such as trade unions and news papers, like the other political families had. Instead they were aligned with the weak neutral pillar.

In 1966 a radical democratic party was founded, Democrats 66. In the foundation several progressive liberals from the VVD had been involved. The party sought to radically democratize the political system, the society and the economy. D66 was led by the charismatic Hans van Mierlo. The party joined forces with the social-democratic PvdA and the progressive Christian PPR to work for a more fair and democratic Netherlands. The party participated in the leftwing cabinet Den Uyl. Over the course of the 1980s however the party began to espouse a more progressive liberal course, especially under Jan Terlouw. The party remained an ally of the PvdA however, joining a short-lived centre-left coalition cabinet with the PvdA and the Christian democratic CDA in 1981.

In the meanwhile the VVD had grown considerably. Under the leadership of Hans Wiegel the VVD has taken a more conservative course. The party began to criticize the large and inefficient welfare state. The party combined this economic liberalism with progressive positions on social issues, which characterized the 1970s, such as abortion, homosexuality and women's rights. The VVD capitalized the weakening of religious and depillarization of the 1970s and made considerable electoral gains: in 1967 the party won just over 10% in 1981 this had more than doubled to 23%.

Between 1982 and 1986 the VVD cooperated in the centre-right cabinets Lubbers, which implemented a far reaching reform of the welfare state the VVD had advocated since the 1970s.

After 1994 
In 1994 the Christian democratic CDA lost its traditional electoral power base. The VVD and D66 won considerably. A progressive purple cabinet was formed with D66 and the VVD under the lead of PvdA. The cabinet managed a thriving Dutch economy, implemented progressive social legislation on euthanasia, gay marriage and prostitution. In the 2002 election campaign the purple coalition came under heavy criticism of the populist politician Pim Fortuyn for mismanaging the public sector, migration and the integration of migrants. The two liberal parties lost considerably in the elections. Liberalism in the Netherlands came under attack after the shock assassination of Fortuyn just days before the election.

The VVD however joined a coalition cabinet with the heirs of Fortuyn and the CDA. The cabinet fell shortly. After the 2003 elections the D66 replaced the LPF. The centre-right cabinet implemented reforms of the welfare state and oversaw declining migration figures.

Migration and integration and especially the place of the Islam in the Netherlands, however, remained controversial issues. In 2003 the VVD had invited social-democratic critic of Islam, Ayaan Hirsi Ali to join their parliamentary party. She together with MP Geert Wilders caused considerable controversy with her direct criticism of the Islam. In the cabinet VVD minister Rita Verdonk sought to limit migration and stimulate integration of minorities. Two years after Fortuyn's assassination, another murder, this time of filmmaker Theo van Gogh, put the country's liberal tradition at further risk.

In 2004 Geert Wilders left the VVD to form the Party for Freedom, which combined uncompromising criticism of Islam with a plea for lower taxation and skepticism towards European integration. In 2006 a conflict between Hirsi Ali and Verdonk over her status as an asylum seeker caused the downfall of the cabinet after D66 had revoked its confidence of Verdonk, whose positions on migration the party had already distanced itself from.

In the 2006 general election the VVD and D66 lost considerably: D66 lost three of its six seats, the VVD six of its 28 seats. Wilders' PVV won nine seats. Rita Verdonk, second on the list of the VVD won more preference votes than the party's top candidate Mark Rutte. After demanding the leadership of the party, Verdonk left the VVD to form her own nationalist party, Proud of the Netherlands.

In the European Parliament election of 2009, the VVD and D66 both won 3 seats each, while PVV picked up 4 seats. The PVV was assigned the additional seat that went to the Netherlands after the Treaty of Lisbon was signed. The VVD and D66 joined the Liberal fraction in the European Parliament, while the PVV did not register as member of any fraction.

In the 2010 general election the VVD returned to previous strength and became the largest party the first time in history with 31 seats, leading to a liberal-led coalition for the first time since 1918. Also D66 increased their number of seats to 10. Ultimately, the VVD opted for a coalition with the CDA, with VVD leader Mark Rutte as prime minister—the first liberal to hold the post since 1918.

Individual Liberal Parties 
Note: The ⇒ sign denotes parties which never achieved any representation in parliament.

From Liberal Union until People's Party for Freedom and Democracy
1885: Liberals formed the Liberal Union (Liberale Unie)
1892: A radical faction formed the ⇒ Radical League (Radicale Bond)
1894: A conservative faction formed the ⇒ Free Liberals
1901: A radical faction seceded to merge with the ⇒ Radical League into the ⇒ Freethinking Democratic League
1921: The LU merged with the ⇒ Economic League, the ⇒ League of Free Liberals, the Neutral Party and the Middle Class Party into the Freedom League (Vrijheidsbond)
1922: A conservative faction seceded as the ⇒ Liberal Party
1928: The Vrijheidsbond is renamed in Liberal State Party (Liberale Staatspartij)
1929: Staalman, founder of the Middle Class Party, leaves the LSP and found the Middle Party for City and Country
1945: The LSP is reorganised into the Freedom Party (Partij van de Vrijheid), including a faction of the ⇒ Freethinking Democratic League
1948: The Freedom Party merged with former members of the Freethinking Democratic League into the present-day People's Party for Freedom and Democracy (Volkspartij voor Vrijheid en Democratie)

Radical League and Free-minded Democratic League
1892: A radical faction of the ⇒ Liberal Union formed the Radical League (Radicale Bond)
1901: A second radical faction of the ⇒ Liberal Union merged with the Radical League into the Free-minded Democratic League (Vrijzinnig Democratische Bond)
1917: A right-wing faction secededas the ⇒ Economic League
1946: The Free-minded Democratic League merged into the present-day Labour Party (Partij van de Arbeid), a faction joined the ⇒ Freedom Party
1948: Some former members left the Labour Party and merged into the ⇒ People's Party for Freedom and Democracy

(League of) Free Liberals
1894: A conservative faction of the ⇒ Liberale Union formed the Free Liberals (Vrije Liberalen), since 1906 renamed the League of Free Liberals (Bond van Vrije Liberalen)
1921: The league merged into the ⇒ Freedom League

Economic League
1917: A right-wing faction of the ⇒ Freethinking Democratic League formed the Economic League (Economische Bond)
1921: The league merged into the ⇒ Freedom League

Liberal Party
1922: A right-wing faction of the ⇒ Freedom League formed the Liberal Party (Liberale Partij) and disappeared in 1925

Democrats 66
1966: Independent progressive liberals formed the party Democrats 66 (Democraten '66), later without apostrophe

Volt
2018: Volt Netherlands (Volt Nederland) was founded.

Liberal leaders
 Liberals in the 19th century
 Johan Rudolf Thorbecke 
 Joannes Kappeyne van de Coppello
 Pieter Cort van der Linden
 Liberal Union
 Nicolaas Pierson
 Theo de Meester
 Cornelis Lely
 Johannes Tak van Poortvliet
 Hendrik Goeman Borgesius
 Pieter Rink
 Radical League/Economic League
 Willem Treub
 League of Free Liberals
 Willem de Beaufort
 Hendrik Dresselhuys
 Samuel van Houten
 Meinard Tydeman
 Hendrik Coenraad Dresselhuijs
 Free-thinking Democratic League
 Philip Kohnstamm
 Dirk Bos
 Hendrik Lodewijk Drucker
 Pieter Oud
 Roelof Kranenburg
 Dolf Joekes
 Liberal Party
 Samuel van Houten
 Freedom Party
 Steven Bierema
 Liberal State Party
 Hendrik Coenraad Dresselhuijs
 Dirk Fock
 Willem Carel Wendelaar
 Ben Telders
 People's Party for Freedom and Democracy
 Pieter Oud
 Edzo Toxopeus
 Molly Geertsema
 Hans Wiegel
 Ed Nijpels
 Rudolf de Korte
 Joris Voorhoeve
 Frits Bolkestein 
 Hans Dijkstal
 Gerrit Zalm
 Jozias van Aartsen
 Mark Rutte
 Dirk Stikker
 Johan Witteveen
 Otto van Lidth de Jeude
 Harm van Riel
 Klaas Dijkhoff
 Arie Pais
 Hans de Koster
 Annemarie Jorritsma
 Haya van Someren
 Annelien Kappeyne van de Coppello
 Henk Kamp
 Uri Rosenthal
 Henk Korthals
 Frits Korthals Altes
 Johan Remkes
 Leendert Ginjaar
 Hans Hoogervorst
 Neelie Kroes
 Jo Schouwenaar-Franssen
 Hans van Baalen
 Henk Vonhoff
 Ivo Opstelten
 Koos Rietkerk
 Democrats 66
 Hans van Mierlo
 Jan Terlouw 
 Els Borst
 Alexander Pechtold
 Jacob Kohnstamm
 Jan Glastra van Loon
 Aar de Goede
 Alexander Rinnooy Kan
 Thom de Graaf
 Hans Wijers
 Roger van Boxtel
 Laurens Jan Brinkhorst
 Sigrid Kaag

Liberal thinkers
In the Contributions to liberal theory the following Dutch thinkers are included:

Erasmus (1466–1536)
Hugo Grotius (1583–1645)
Baruch Spinoza (1632–1677)
Johan Rudolf Thorbecke (1798–1872)

Parliamentary representation

See also
 Anarchism in the Netherlands
 History of the Netherlands
 Politics of the Netherlands
 List of political parties in the Netherlands
 Loevestein faction, Dutch States Party
 Orangism (Kingdom of the Netherlands)
 Socialism in the Netherlands
 Christian democracy in the Netherlands
 Pim Fortuyn List
 Party for Freedom

References

 
Netherlands
Political history of the Netherlands
Philosophy and thought in the Dutch Republic